Christmas with a Capital C is a 2010 American Christian drama direct-to-DVD film directed by Helmut Schleppi. The film's plot was based on a song of the same name by Christian band Go Fish, whose name was inspired by one of actor Brad Stine's stand-up comedy routines. It centers on what, in recent years, has been dubbed the "War on Christmas" in the United States.

Plot 
Christmas has always been an exceptional time of love and tradition in the small town of Trapper Falls, Alaska. Hometown of Mayor Dan Reed (Ted McGinley) looks forward to each year with enthusiasm to all the events, friends and family that fill this special season. Together with his brother Greg (Brad Stine), they dedicate time away from their adventure tour company to drape the town is Christmas cheer. When Dan's old high school rival Mitch Bright (Daniel Baldwin), a mean-spirited and embittered militant atheist returns home after 20 years, Dan is immediately suspicious. Mitch is a highly successful big city lawyer who has never wanted anything to do with Trapper Falls. The rivalry re-ignites when the frustrated Mitch takes offense to what he sees as the town's violation of his rights. Mitch wants the Nativity scene removed from the front of City hall and the word Christmas switched to Happy Holidays on all signs. Fifty years of tradition are now challenged not by an outsider, but a former member of the community. As the conflict escalates, it goes beyond one person's opinion but magnifies into an entire town problem when Mitch enters into the mayoral race to have Dan replaced.

In the heat of the legal battle and facing certain defeat, Dan's wife Kristen (Nancy Stafford) and their daughter Makayla (Francesca Derosa), wanting to show what she believes to be the true meaning of Christmas, are inspired to launch a "Christmas with a Capital C" campaign as an effort to keep the town together. In doing so they discover the secret behind Mitch's return: he is looking for love and acceptance, but can't find it in the world of high-flown success.

Cast 

 Ted McGinley as Dan Reed
 Daniel Baldwin as Mitch Bright
 Nancy Stafford as Kristen Reed
 Brad Stine as Greg Reed
 Cooper Peltz as Cody Reed
 Ron Holmstrom as Rev. Tiller

Release 
Originally, the Pureflix Entertainment website accepted pre-sale orders for the film in late 2010, with an original DVD release date of November 2, 2010. Without explanation, the pre-order link was removed sometime in the fall. On November 22, 2010, the Gospel Music Channel announced that it would air the film during the 2010 Christmas season. The film broadcast several times from December 5, 2010 until December 25, 2010. The film was also shown in select theaters and churches. Pureflix later updated their website to set the DVD release for November 8, 2011, eventually revising that date to November 1, 2011.

Reception 
Prior to the film's release, the film's trailer sparked ridicule and criticism on several blogs, news sites, and discussion forums including the British comedy panel show 8 out of 10 Cats. The Portland Mercury and others characterized the trailer as "anti-atheist". Some reviewers have pointed to similarities with the Grinch tale. The film itself was mostly reviewed by Christian organizations such as the Dove Foundation, which reviewed it favorably. The film won the Faith & Freedom Award for Television at the 2011 Movieguide Awards.

Log lines 
In Pureflix's promotional materials, the film's title is often accompanied by the log line, "Putting Christ Back in Christmas". GMCTV, in their promotional materials, opted for the log line, "The Reason for the Season".

See also 
 List of Christmas films

References

External links 
 
 

2010 films
Films about evangelicalism
American Christmas films
2010s English-language films